Chitra Mandal is a chemical biologist in the field of biomolecules and their applications in health and diseases. Later she worked on cancer therapeutics. She served as the acting Director of CSIR - Indian Institute of Chemical biology in Kolkata, India. during 2014-2015.

Education and career 
Mandal completed her PhD early on in her career from Indian Institute of Science, Bangalore, in the area of bio-organic chemistry. She went on to do post doctoral research at University of Pennsylvania in Philadelphia. Returning to India, she joined and serve CSIR-IICB as a senior scientist. Later she went on to head the Innovation Complex in Kolkata, and then its Director from 2010-2015. Her research area is mainly the glycosylation of biomolecules and their potential application in disease management, cancer and tumor immunology. The lab is also investigating low cost healthcare solutions using medicinal plants indigenous to India, for example, the identification of a non-toxic herbal molecule in cancer cell treatments.

References

External links 
 Cancer Biology & Inflammatory Disorder Division

Year of birth missing (living people)
Living people
Bengali chemists
Indian women biochemists
Indian Institute of Science alumni